Changfeng Park is a metro station on the Line 15 of the Shanghai Metro. Located at the intersection of Daduhe Road and East Yunling Road in Putuo District, Shanghai, the station is scheduled to open with the rest of Line 15 by the end of 2020. The station is named after the nearby Changfeng Park. It is located in between  station to the north and  station to the south. The station has 3 platforms, one island and one side platform. The inner island platform is not in service. Trains heading to Zi-Zhu Hi-Tech Park use the outer island platform, whilst trains towards Gucun Park use the side platform.

References 

Railway stations in Shanghai
Shanghai Metro stations in Putuo District
Line 15, Shanghai Metro
Railway stations in China opened in 2021